Mosley, also spelt Moseley, is a surname of English origin. The Mosleys were the lords of the manor of Ancoats until 1846. They also became wealthy landowners in Staffordshire (see Mosley Baronets).

Notable people 
Nicholas Mosley (mayor) (c. 1527–1612), English politician
Sir Edward Mosley, 2nd Baronet (1639–1665), English politician
Sir Oswald Mosley, 2nd Baronet, of Ancoats (1785–1871), English politician
Ashton Nicholas Every Mosley (1792–1875), English politician
Sir Oswald Mosley, 4th Baronet (1848–1915), British baronet
Tonman Mosley, 1st Baron Anslow (1850–1933), British politician
Sir Oswald Mosley (1896–1980), leader of the British Union of Fascists
Lady Cynthia Mosley (1898–1933), first wife of Oswald Mosley
Nicholas Mosley, 3rd Baron Ravensdale (1923–2017), English novelist, eldest son of Oswald and Cynthia Mosley
Ivo Mosley (born 1951), son of Nicholas Mosley, British writer
Daniel Mosley, 4th Baron Ravensdale (born 1982), grandson of Nicholas Mosley, British peer
Diana Mosley (1910–2003), second wife of Oswald Mosley, formerly Diana Mitford
Max Mosley (1940–2021), son of Oswald and Diana Mosley, former president of the Fédération Internationale de l'Automobile

Other people with the surname 
Other people with the family name Mosley include:
 Andrew Mosley (1885–1917), English footballer
Barbara Tyson Mosley (born 1950), American artist
 Ben Mosley (born 1981), British artist
 Bob Mosley (born 1942), American musician
 Brandon Mosley (born 1988), American football player
 Brett Mosley, operator of BuyMyTronics.com
 Bryan Mosley (1931–1999), British actor
 C. J. Mosley (defensive lineman) (born 1983), American football player
 C. J. Mosley (linebacker) (born 1992), American football player
 Charles Mosley (coach) (1888–1968), American college sports coach
 Charles Mosley (genealogist) (1948–2013), British author and editor of genealogies
 Chris Mosley, American football coach
 Chuck Mosley (1959–2017), American singer
 Cindy Mosley (born 1975), American footballer
 Daryl Mosley (born 1964), American musician
 Dennis Mosley (born 1957), American football player
 Donald Mosley, co-founder of Habitat for Humanity
 Earle Mosley (born 1946), American football coach
 Eddie Mosley (1947–2020), American serial killer
 Edward Mosley (MP for Preston) (died 1638), English lawyer and politician
 Edna Mosley (1899–1954), English architect
 Eleanor Mosley (1700–?), English businesswoman
 Eli Mosley, pseudonym of Elliot Kline (born 1991), American Neo-nazi and former head of Identity Evropa
 Geoff Mosley (born 1931), Australian conservationist
 Ellen Mosley, maiden name of Ellen Mosley-Thompson, American climatologist
 Glenn Mosley (basketball) (born 1955), American basketball player
 Henry Mosley (1852–1953), English cricketer
 Henry Mosley (bishop) (1868–1948), English bishop
 Hinson Mosley (born 1932), American politician
 Ian Mosley (born 1953), English drummer in the band Marillion
 Isiaih Mosley (born 2000), American basketball player
 J. Brooke Mosley (1915–1988), American bishop
 Jack Mosley, American boxing coach
 Jamahl Mosley (born 1978), American basketball player and coach
 James Mosley (born 1935), English historian specialized in the history of printing and letter design
 Jamey Mosley (born 1995), American football player
 Jamie Mosley (born 1969), American racecar driver
 John Mosley (1921–2015), American football player and soldier
 John W. Mosley (1907–1969), American photographer
 Joshua Mosley (born 1974), American artist
 Judy Mosley, maiden name of Judy Mosley-McAfee (1968–2013), American basketball player
 Karla Mosley (born 1981), American actress
 Kendrick Mosley (born 1981), American football player
 Lacey Mosley, maiden name of Lacey Sturm (born 1981), American vocalist for the band Flyleaf
 Layna Mosley, American political scientist
 Leonard Mosley (1913–1992) British journalist, historian, biographer and novelist
 Michael Mosley (actor) (born 1978), American actor
 Michael Mosley (broadcaster) (born 1957), British BBC television presenter, producer, and journalist
 Mike Mosley (1946–1984), American racecar driver
 Mike Mosley (American football) (born 1958), American football player
 Miles Mosley (born 1980), American musician
 Paul Mosley, American politician
 Ramaa Mosley (born 1978), American filmmaker
 Richard Mosley (born 1949), Canadian judge
 Robert Mosley (1927–2002), American opera singer
 Robert Mosley (pop musician), American vocalist
 Rocky Mosley Jr (born 1956), American boxer
 Roger E. Mosley (1938–2022), American actor
 Russ Mosley (1918–1997), American football player
 Sean Mosley (born 1989), American basketball player for Hapoel Tel Aviv B.C. of the Israeli Basketball Premier League
 Seth Mosley (born 1987), American musician
 Shane Mosley (born 1971), American boxing champion
 Snub Mosley (1905–1981), American jazz musician
 Stefan Mosley (born 1952), American author
 Stephen Mosley (born 1972), Member of Parliament for the City of Chester, England.
 Tereneh Mosley, American fashion designer
 Thaddeus Mosley (born 1926), American sculptor
 Timothy Mosley (born 1971), known as Timbaland, American hip hop producer rapper
 Tonya Mosley, American broadcast journalist
 Tracey Mosley (born 1973), Australian softball player
 Walter Mosley (born 1952), American crime fiction writer
 Walter Mosley (US lawyer), American lawyer
 Walter Harold Mosley (1916–1942), American fighter pilot
 Walter T. Mosley (born 1967), American politician
 Wayne Mosley, founder of Rocky Rococo (pizza chain)
 Wendell Mosley (1932–1989), American football player and coach
 William Mosley (born 1989), American basketball player
 Zack Mosley (1906–1993), American comic strip artist

See also
 Mosley Mayne (1889–1995), British military officer
 Henry Moseley (1887–1915), Noted British physicist killed at Gallipoli
 Moseley (surname)
 Mozley, surname

English families
English toponymic surnames
English-language surnames